Valley of the Giants is the only album by Canadian indie rock supergroup Valley of the Giants. It was released in February 2004 on the record label Arts & Crafts.

Track listing
 "Claudia & Klaus" – 5:49
 "Westworld" – 6:26
 "Cantara Sin Guitara" – 8:05
 "Beyond the Valley" – 9:59
 "Waiting to Catch a Bullet" – 10:00
 "Whaling Tale" – 8:57
 "Back to God's Country" – 9:16
 "Bala Bay Inn" – 7:00

References

2004 debut albums
Valley of the Giants (band) albums
Arts & Crafts Productions albums